The Weiser Post Office, at Main and W. 1st Sts. in Weiser, Idaho, was built in 1932.  It was listed on the National Register of Historic Places in 1982.

It was designed by architects Tourtellotte & Hummel in Georgian Revival style.  Its main section is two stories tall, and it has a rear ell at the center rear.  It has a flat roof behind a parapet that has sections of enclosed balustrades.

References

National Register of Historic Places in Washington County, Idaho
Colonial Revival architecture in Idaho
Buildings and structures completed in 1932